CBE-FM is the call sign of the CBC Music station in Windsor, Ontario, Canada. The station broadcasts at 89.9 FM.

The station was launched on March 4, 1979.

External links
CBC Windsor
 

BE-FM
BE-FM
Radio stations established in 1978
1978 establishments in Ontario